Šarūnas Vasiliauskas (born 27 March 1989) is a Lithuanian professional basketball player for BC Budivelnyk of the Ukrainian Basketball SuperLeague (UBSL). He plays as a point guard.

Professional career
On 8 August 2016, Vasiliauskas signed with Joventut Badalona. On 14 December 2016, he parted ways with Joventut after averaging 5.3 points in Liga ACB. The next day, he signed with Turkish club Uşak Sportif for the rest of the season.

On July 19, 2017, he signed with Turkish club Trabzonspor of the Basketbol Süper Ligi (BSL).

On June 28, 2018, he signed with Gaziantep of the Basketbol Süper Ligi (BSL).

On July 18, 2020, he has signed with Petkim Spor of the Turkish Basketball Super League.

On July 22, 2021, he has signed with CSO Voluntari of the Liga Națională.

On June 7, 2022, Vasiliauskas signed with the Scarborough Shooting Stars of the CEBL.

References

External links
Profile at BasketNews.lt

1989 births
Living people
2014 FIBA Basketball World Cup players
Basketball players from Kaunas
BC Lietkabelis players
BC Pieno žvaigždės players
BC Prienai players
BC Žalgiris players
CSO Voluntari players
Gaziantep Basketbol players
Joventut Badalona players
Liga ACB players
Lithuanian expatriate basketball people in Poland
Lithuanian expatriate basketball people in Spain
Lithuanian expatriate basketball people in Turkey
Lithuanian men's basketball players
LSU-Atletas basketball players
Petkim Spor players
Point guards
Trabzonspor B.K. players
Trefl Sopot players
Uşak Sportif players